PC Music is a record label and art collective based in London and run by producer A. G. Cook. It was founded in 2013, making its music available on SoundCloud that year. Artists on its roster have included Hannah Diamond, GFOTY, Danny L Harle, EASYFUN, Namasenda, and Planet 1999. The label's releases have been showcased on the compilations PC Music Volume 1 (2015), Volume 2 (2016), and Volume 3 (2022).

The label is known for its surreal or exaggerated take on pop music tropes from the 1990s and 2000s, often featuring pitch-shifted, feminine vocals and bright, synthetic textures. PC Music has been characterized as embracing the aesthetics of advertising, consumerism, and corporate branding. Its artists often present devised personas inspired by cyberculture. The label has inspired both praise and criticism from journalists, and has been called "polarizing".

Background
The label functions as a collective in which acts frequently collaborate with each other. Many of the acts are aliases, obscuring the identities and number of artists on the label. Early on, the label kept tight control over its branding and limited its interaction with journalists, and as its profile grew, Cook declined to engage with press, described as a sort of Berry Gordy figure within the group. Vice magazine said that PC Music's acts are best understood not as living people but as "meticulously planned and considered long-running art pieces…living installations who put out music." Cook mentioned preference for "recording people who don't normally make music and treating them as if they're a major label artist." Rather than engaging in extended promotional campaigns, the label continually announces new acts. Each develops a persona that is conveyed through Internet slang and cartoon imagery.

History
Cook had previously worked on Gamsonite, a "pseudo-label" and blog collecting his early collaborations, among other projects while studying music at Goldsmiths, University of London. He founded PC Music in August 2013, as a way of embracing an A&R role. Within a year the label had published 40 songs on SoundCloud where, as of September 2014, some of its songs had accumulated over 100,000 listens. It had not released a physical single, and its first paid download did not come until the November 2014 release of Hannah Diamond's "Every Night". QT's "Hey QT" single was also released in 2014, on XL Recordings, with production from Cook and PC Music-affiliate Sophie.

In March 2014, the label made their live debut in the United States when Cook, Sophie and QT performed at Hype Machine's Hype Hotel during South by Southwest. The following year, in March 2015, several members of the collective appeared at a label showcase at South by Southwest. Cook described it as a "rebirth moment" for the group, moving toward functioning as a real record label. Shortly after, they released their first official compilation album, titled PC Music Volume 1. On 8 May 2015, PC Music artists performed at BRIC House in Brooklyn, New York as part of the Red Bull Music Academy Festival, to premiere Pop Cube, "a multimedia reality network".

On 21 October 2015, the label announced on Facebook a partnership with major record label Columbia Records. The first release through this partnership was an EP from Danny L Harle. In December 2015 PC Music released the single "Only You", a collaboration between A. G. Cook and the Chinese pop star Chris Lee, with a music video directed by Kinga Burza.

On 18 November 2016, PC Music released PC Music Volume 2, a compilation featuring most of the label's roster. A review in The Guardian praised it for being "more beautiful and progressive than ever before" and proof that "Cook and his gang are the cleverest, most thoughtful people in British pop".

On 16 February 2018, PC Music released a limited dual-vinyl compilation of both PC Music Volumes 1 and 2 and in December 2018, PC Music announced new vinyl and CD reissues of PC Music Volumes 1 and 2, as well as the first physical release of the label's Month of Mayhem compilation. GFOTY also announced her departure from the label at this time. She has since signed with a new label, Pretty Wavvy.

Sound and influences
The label has released music with a consistent sound that Clive Martin, writing for Vice, described as "A playful composite of disregarded sounds and genres". Lanre Bakare, writing for The Guardian, identified the music's elements as "the huge synth blasts favoured by Eurodance chart-botherers such as Cascada, grime's sub-bass, and happy hardcore's high-pitched vocal range". The styles and influences of music incorporated include bubblegum dance, Balearic trance, wonky and electro house. Cook cites Korean & Japanese pop music and gyaru culture, as well as the production work of Max Martin and Jimmy Jam and Terry Lewis. His production involves layering discordant sounds on top of each other to produce chaotic mixes, similar to the techniques used in black MIDI music. Abrupt shifts in timbre and rhythm are used to create multiple perspectives of a personality. Cook also indirectly cites American musician Conlon Nancarrow as a source of inspiration in the PC Music Pop Cube Trailer 1.

PC Music's songwriting often deals with consumerism as a theme. In their take on haul videos, Lipgloss Twins include references to fashion and makeup brands. Vocals on the label's mix for DIS Magazine reflect various forms of marketing: producer ID tags, film trailers, and product placement for a sponsor. The label brings in inexperienced singers to record its songs. It thoroughly processes the vocals, shifting the pitch upward or chopping it to use as a rhythmic element. These distortions create a post-ironic representation of consumerism, money, and sex.

PC Music's aesthetic combines elements of cuteness, camp, and kawaii, though often, as music critic Maurice Marion points out for Rare Candy, with a sinister, Lynchian undertone achieved by dissonant inversions and caustic harmonization. Critics likened the label to Ryan Trecartin in its irregular pacing, "feminine appropriation", and valley girl slang. In a piece for Vice, Ryan Bassil suggested that PC Music's style allows for a more candid expression of emotions.

PC Music has been described as less "macho" take on the "house revival", bringing "playfulness and femininity" to dance music subculture. The availability of music software has allowed for the spread of high-production dance music by independent musicians, particularly on SoundCloud. PC Music often exaggerates the homogenised, high-fidelity aesthetics of these songs. Vogue deputy editor Alex Frank commented that the overt manipulation of cultural references showcased a cynical sense of humour, creating an insular approach to making dance music during a period of house revival.

In the late 2010s, the term "hyperpop" began to be used as a microgenre referring to music associated with the PC Music label and the artists it influenced.

Reception
As PC Music became more prominent in 2014, the reaction to it was often described as "divisive". Joe Moynihan, writing in Fact, remarked that "PC Music have, in just over a year, released some of the most compelling pop music in recent memory." Some critics have found its high-tempo trance sound artless or aggravating.

PC Music received accolades in several 2014 year-end summaries. Dazed included A. G. Cook at number 12 in their "Dazed 100"; Fact named PC Music the best label of 2014; The Huffington Post included PC Music at number 3 in their "Underrated Albums - 2014"; Resident Advisor included PC Music at number 4 in their "Top Labels of The Year" in 2014; and Tiny Mix Tapes included it in their "Favorite 15 Labels of 2014". Spin magazine named PC Music its "Trend of the Year" for 2014. In 2021, The Forty-Five named several PC Music artists – including A.G. Cook, umru and Hannah Diamond – in their list of the best hyperpop songs of all time.

Live shows
PC Music have produced a number of label focused showcases since their inception. After a brief showcase at SXSW in 2015, on 8 May 2015, PC Music launched a "multimedia reality network" called 'Pop Cube'. An event in conjunction with the network was created and became part of the Red Bull Music Academy Festival in New York, which quickly sold out. In May 2016, PC Music presented 'Pop Cosmos' at the Scala in London, featuring Danny L Harle, Hannah Diamond, GFOTY, A. G. Cook, Felicita, Easyfun and Spinee. In July 2016 PC Music held a new one-off event called 'Pop City' at Create in Los Angeles. As well as scheduled performances from PC Music performers, the show featured guests, including Carly Rae Jepsen, Charli XCX, and QT. On the 405 webzine, PC Music’s live shows have been described as being surrounded by a care-less authentic aura and have been recognised for their "forward-thinking fearlessness to push pop music into new and daring areas".

Artists
Current roster of artists signed to the label

 A. G. Cook
 Astra King
 caro♡
 EasyFun
 felicita
 Hannah Diamond
 Holly Waxwing
 Hyd
 Lil Data
 Namasenda
 Ö
 Planet 1999
 umru

Artists previously signed to the label

 Danny L Harle
 Finn Diesel
 GFOTY
 Kane West (Gus Lobban of Kero Kero Bonito)
 Spinee
 Tommy Cash

Artists with only one solo release on the label

 Chris Lee
 Maxo
 Princess Bambi
 Tielsie

Group projects and alternative aliases on the label

 AFK (Ö & A. G. Cook)
 Danny Sunshine (Danny L Harle)
 DJ LIFELINE (A. G. Cook)
 DJ Warlord (A. G. Cook)
 Dux Content (A. G. Cook and Danny L Harle)
 EasyFX (A. G. Cook and EasyFun)
 Guys Next Door (A. G. Cook and Oneohtrix Point Never)
 Life Sim (speculated to be A. G. Cook)
 Lipgloss Twins (A. G. Cook and Felicita)
 MC Boing (Danny L Harle and Lil Data)
 Nu New Edition (speculated to be A. G. Cook and/or Finn Diesel)
 Thy Slaughter (A. G. Cook and EasyFun)
 U.R.S.U.L.A. (speculated to be A. G. Cook & Spinee)

Vocalists and other featured artists on the label

 645AR
 Aj simons
 Alaska Reid
 Banoffee
 Carly Rae Jepsen
 Caroline Polachek
 Cecile Believe
 Charli XCX
 Chloe Sachikonye
 Clairo
 Denzel Himself
 Ellen Roberts
 Emily Verlander
 Eyelar
 emotegi
 Goth Jafar
 Harriet Pittard
 Hazel Yule
 Iiris
 Joey LaBeija
 Kero Kero Bonito
 La Zowi
 Laura Les
 Lewis Grant
 Matt Copson
 Merlin Nova
 Mowalola
 Noonie Bao
 Oklou
 Petal Supply
 Phoebe Ryan
 Raffy
 Ravenna Golden
 Rebecca Black
 Sarah Bonito
 Sophie Cates
 Sounds Like A U Problem

Artists with at least one remixed release by an artist on the label

 100 gecs
 Banoffee
 Baauer
 Bladee
 Bleachers
 Caroline Polachek
 Casey MQ
 Charli XCX
 Christine and the Queens
 DJ DJ Booth
 Dreamtrak
 Ed Sheeran
 Erika de Casier
 Hikaru Utada
 How To Dress Well
 Janet Jackson
 K.I.D
 Kacy Hill
 Kero Kero Bonito
 Lady Gaga
 lil aaron
 Max Tundra
 MNEK
 Oklou
 Oneohtrix Point Never
 Orchin
 Perfume Genius
 Phoenix
 Rostam
 Sekai no Owari
 Silly Boy Blue
 Slayyyter
 Spector
 Tinashe
 Wave Racer
 Whethan
 Yelle

Discography

Compilation albums

Extended plays

References

External links
 
 
 

Record labels established in 2013
British independent record labels
Electronic music record labels
Pop record labels
Record labels based in London